Second-seeded Fred Perry defeated Gottfried von Cramm 6–3, 3–6, 6–1, 6–3 in the final to win the men's singles tennis title at the 1935 French Championships.

Seeds
The seeded players are listed below. Fred J. Perry is the champion; others show the round in which they were eliminated.

  Gottfried von Cramm (finalist)
  Fred Perry (champion)
  Jack Crawford (semifinals)
  Bunny Austin (semifinals)
  Roderich Menzel (quarterfinals)
  Giorgio de Stefani (fourth round)
  Christian Boussus (quarterfinals)
  Vivian McGrath (quarterfinals)
  André Martin-Legeay (fourth round)
  Harry Hopman (fourth round)
  Marcel Bernard (quarterfinals)
  Adrian Quist (fourth round)
  André Merlin (fourth round)
  Josef Caska (fourth round)
  Don Turnbull (fourth round)
  Vernon Kirby (third round)

Draw

Key
 Q = Qualifier
 WC = Wild card
 LL = Lucky loser
 r = Retired

Finals

Earlier rounds

Section 1

Section 2

Section 3

Section 4

Section 5

Section 6

Section 7

Section 8

References

External links
 

1935 in French tennis
1935